Linda Ferga married Khodadin (born 24 December 1976 in Paris) is a French former athlete who competed in the 100 metres hurdles and 60 metres hurdles indoor.

Competitions record

Lina was also Champion of France for the  100 metres hurdles in 2005 (12.66s).

References

 
 
 FFA profile

1976 births
Living people
French female long jumpers
French female hurdlers
Athletes (track and field) at the 2000 Summer Olympics
Athletes (track and field) at the 2004 Summer Olympics
Olympic athletes of France
Athletes from Paris
Mediterranean Games silver medalists for France
Mediterranean Games medalists in athletics
Athletes (track and field) at the 1997 Mediterranean Games
21st-century French women